Chiloglottis grammata, commonly known as the small bird orchid, is a species of orchid endemic to Tasmania. It has two broad leaves and a single greenish purple to purple flower with short, shiny greenish to reddish or black calli and low ridges resembling writing, covering most of the upper surface of the labellum. It is widespread and common in high rainfall mountainous areas.

Description
Flowering occurs from October to February.

Taxonomy and naming
Chiloglottis grammata was first formally described in 1991 by Geoffrey Carr and the description was published in Indigenous Flora and Fauna Association Miscellaneous Paper 1 from a specimen collected from Jackeys Marsh in the Meander Valley.

Distribution and habitat
The small bird orchid is widespread and locally common in Tasmania, especially in moist to wet forest in mountainous areas, sometimes forming dense colonies.

References

External links 

grammata
Orchids of Tasmania
Plants described in 1991